Edmonton-Mill Woods is a provincial electoral district in Alberta, Canada. It is one of 87 current electoral districts mandated to return a single member to the Legislative Assembly of Alberta using the first past the post method of voting.

This urban district is located in south central Edmonton was created in the 1979 boundary redistribution from Edmonton-Avonmore. The electoral district since its creation has been a swing riding controlled by the Progressive Conservatives, New Democrats and Liberals. The current representative is New Democrat Christina Gray who was first elected in 2015, and re-elected in 2019.

History
The electoral district was created in the 1979 boundary redistribution from Edmonton-Avonmore.

The 2010 boundary redistribution saw some changes made to the riding. The south boundary was pushed southward from 23 Avenue east of Mill Woods Drive to Anthony Henday Drive in land that used to be part of Edmonton-Ellerslie. The east boundary was changed to cede land south of Mill Creek to Edmonton-Mill Creek.

Boundary history

Electoral history

The electoral district was created in the 1979 boundary redistribution. The election held that year saw Progressive Conservative candidate Milt Pahl won a large majority to pick up the new seat for his party. He won a second term in the 1982 general election. He more than doubled his popular vote but faced a strong challenge from NDP candidate Gerry Gibeault and ended up decreasing his overall percentage.

Premier Peter Lougheed would appoint Pahl to the provincial cabinet as a Minister without Portfolio. He held that going into the 1986 general election while attempting to run for his third term in office. The election that year saw a rematch between Gibeault and Pahl.

The race in 1986 was very close with Gibeault winning by less than 100 votes to pick up the seat for the New Democrats. He won a higher popular vote running for a second term in the 1989 general election but his overall percent was reduced. He moved to the Edmonton-Ellerslie electoral district to run for election in 1993 and was defeated.

Liberal candidate Don Massey won the district in the 1993 election to pick it up for his party. He was re-elected with a smaller majority in the 1997 election and just barely held onto the district in the 2001 general election as he face a strong challenge from future Progressive Conservative MLA Carl Benito.

Massey briefly became leader of the provincial Liberals in 2004. He decided not to run again for office and retired at dissolution of the assembly later that year. His replacement in the legislature was Liberal candidate Weslyn Mather who won the district with just under half the popular vote in the 2004 election.

Mather was defeated by Carl Benito in the 2008 election who managed to win the seat for the Progressive Conservatives for the first time in 22 years.

Legislature results

1979 general election

1982 general election

1986 general election

1989 general election

1993 general election

1997 general election

2001 general election

2004 general election

2008 general election

2012 general election

2015 general election

2019 general election

Senate nominee results

2004 Senate nominee election district results

Voters had the option of selecting 4 Candidates on the Ballot

2012 Senate nominee election district results

References

External links 
The Legislative Assembly of Alberta

Alberta provincial electoral districts
Politics of Edmonton